An election for Mayor of Indianapolis is scheduled to be held on November 7, 2023. Primary elections will be held on May 2. Incumbent Democratic mayor Joe Hogsett is running for re-election to a third term in office.

Democratic primary

Candidates

Declared
Joe Hogsett, incumbent mayor
Bob Kern, perennial candidate
Clif Marsiglio, community activist
Robin Shackleford, Indiana state representative
Larry Vaughn, community activist

Withdrawn
Gregory Meriweather, community engagement consultant (endorsed Shackleford)

Results

Endorsements

Republican primary

Candidates

Declared
John Couch, business owner
James Jackson, pastor
Abdul-Hakim Shabazz, political reporter
Jefferson Shreve, former city councilor

Declined
Joe Elsener, chair of the Marion County Republican Party
Steve Sorrel, businessman

Results

References

External links 
Official campaign websites
 Joe Hogsett (D) for Mayor
 Robin Shackleford (D) for Mayor
 Abdul-Hakim Shabazz (R) for Mayor

2023 United States mayoral elections
2023 Indiana elections
2023